This is a list of the winners of, and nominees for, the Kids' Choice Award for Favorite Movie, given at the Nickelodeon Kids' Choice Awards.

Winners and nominees

References

Favorite Movie
Lists of films by award
Awards for best film